The formal jubilees of British monarchs started with George III. At the start of the 50th year of his reign, his jubilee was celebrated throughout the British Isles and his colonial possessions. Later monarchs added other jubilee years.

George III

Victoria

George V

Elizabeth II
The first Jubilee-like celebration for Queen Elizabeth II was in 1962, as it marked her 10th anniversary on the throne. The Royal Mint also released a number of sovereigns, bearing the ‘Young Head’ portrait of The Queen by Mary Gillick in 1962, to mark the milestone.

Queen Elizabeth II's jubilees are listed below:

Gallery

References

External links

The Guardian - What is a jubilee?
Jubilee-ation!: A History of Royal Jubilees in Public Parks
How The Queen's silver, golden and diamond jubilees compare by The Telegraph
Platinum Jubilee: How have we celebrated in the past? by BBC News

Jubilee
Jubilee